Karl Günther (25 November 1885 – 27 June 1951) was an Austrian film actor.

Selected filmography
 The Masked Ones (1920)
 The Riddle of the Sphinx (1921)
 The Adventuress of Monte Carlo (1921)
 The Call of Destiny (1922)
 Your Valet (1922)
 Modern Vices (1924)
 The Queen of Moulin Rouge (1926)
 Lady Windermere's Fan (1935)
 Court Theatre (1936)
 Alarm in Peking (1937)
 Premiere (1937)
 The Charm of La Boheme (1937)
 A Prussian Love Story (1938)
 The Roundabouts of Handsome Karl (1938)
 Triad (1938)
 Secret Code LB 17 (1938)
 Maria Ilona (1939)
 Hotel Sacher (1939)
 Stern von Rio (1940)
 Women Are Better Diplomats (1941)
 Der große König (1942)
 Andreas Schlüter (1942)
 A Man With Principles? (1943)
 The Big Number (1943)
 Romance in a Minor Key (1943)
 The Second Shot (1943)
 The War of the Oxen (1943)
 Nora (1944)
 The Roedern Affair (1944)
 The Queen of the Landstrasse (1948)
 The Heavenly Waltz (1948)
 The Other Life (1948)
 The Angel with the Trumpet (1948)
 White Gold (1949)
 Dear Friend (1949)
 Eroica (1949)
 Cordula (1950)
 Bonus on Death (1950)

Bibliography
 Bergfelder, Tim & Bock, Hans-Michael. ''The Concise Cinegraph: Encyclopedia of German. Berghahn Books, 2009.

External links

1885 births
1951 deaths
Austrian male film actors
Austrian male silent film actors
Male actors from Vienna
20th-century Austrian male actors